Zamfir is both a Romanian given name and surname. Notable people with the name include:

Surname
 Cristina Zamfir (born 1989), Romanian handballer
 Gheorghe Zamfir (born 1941), Romanian pan-flute musician
 Mircea Zamfir (born 1985), Romanian gymnast
 Nicolae Zamfir (born 1944), Romanian football manager

Given name
 Zamfir Arbore (1848–1933), Romanian activist
 Zamfir Dumitrescu (1946–2021), Romanian painter
 Zamfir Munteanu, politician

See also
 Safir (disambiguation)
 Zamfirescu
 Zamfirești (disambiguation)

Romanian masculine given names
Romanian-language surnames